Hablas (also Romanized as Hāblas) is a village in Lahijan-e Sharqi Rural District, Lajan District, Piranshahr County, West Azerbaijan Province, Iran. At the 2006 census, its population was 41, in 7 families.

References 

Populated places in Piranshahr County